Zauralsky is an urban locality (an urban-type settlement) in Yemanzhelinsky District of Chelyabinsk Oblast, Russia. Population:

References

Urban-type settlements in Chelyabinsk Oblast